Aowin/Suaman District is a former district that was located in Western Region (now currently in Western North Region), Ghana. Originally created as an ordinary district assembly in 1988, which was created from the former Aowin-Amenfi District Council. However, on 28 June 2012, it was split off into two new districts: Aowin Municipal District (which it was elevated to municipal district assembly status on 16 November 2017 (effectively 15 March 2018); capital: Enchi) and Suaman District (capital: Dadieso). The district assembly was located in the western part of Western Region and had Enchi as its capital town.

Geography
Aowin/Suaman District shared common boundaries with Wassa Amenfi, Jomoro, Sefwi-Wiawso and Juabeso-Bia Districts. It was bordered by Côte d'Ivoire to the west. The two main rivers were Tano and Bia and along with numerous tributaries were perennials which drained the district all the year round.

Sources
 
 GhanaDistricts.com

References

Districts of the Western North Region